Red crab may refer to:
 Red king crab (Paralithodes camtschaticus)
 Christmas Island red crab (Gecarcoidea natalis)
 Chaceon quinquedens, also known as the "deep-sea red crab"
 Pleuroncodes planipes, a squat lobster also known as the "pelagic red crab"
 Dungeness crab (Metacarcinus magister)

Animal common name disambiguation pages